Philip Services Corp. was a Canadian recycler based in Hamilton, Ontario.  It was accused of accounting fraud in its 1997 financial statements and filed for bankruptcy under Chapter 11 in 1999.

History and Ownership
Carl Icahn led the restructuring negotiations during Philip's first bankruptcy in 1999.  Icahn and partners owned 14% of the company's common equity and were the largest holders of Philips debt at the time, with approximately $200 million of debt.

Accounting fraud and settlement
A class action launched on behalf of US investors against Philip's Canadian auditor  Deloitte & Touche LLP was settled in 2007 with Deloitte agreeing to pay US$50.5 million. As part of the settlement, the insurance company for directors and officers agreed to pay $18.25 million.  The underwriters of Philip's 1997 stock offering, Merrill Lynch and Salomon Brothers, agreed to pay a total of $11 million as part of the same settlement.

Criminal prosecution and regulatory actions
 In 2014, Robert K. Waxman, former president of Philips' metals trading division, was convicted of four counts of fraud over $5,000 and sentenced to a total of 26 years in prison. The sentences were 8 years, 8 years, 5 years and 5 years repsectively, with the sentences to be served concurrently.  Waxman was charged by the RCMP in 2007 of "elaborate frauds and thefts" totalling over US$17 million in 1996 and 1997.
 David Graham Hoey and John Alexander Woodcroft,  both former executives of Philip Services were sanctioned in 2012 by the self-regulatory body for chartered accountants in Ontario, the Institute for Chartered Accountants of Ontario. Both were fined CAD$10,000 and suspended for two years.  Hoey was Senior Vice President Finance for Philip in 1997 and Woodcroft was Executive Vice President of Operations at the same time.
 The Ontario Securities Commission agreed to fines and bans for five of Philip's senior executives in March 2006:
 Allen Fracassi, former chief executive officer, was banned from serving as a director or officer of a company for 12 years, and fined $100,000.
 Phillip Fracassi, former Chief Operating Officer, was banned from serving as a director or officer of a company for 10 years, and fined $100,000. Allen and Phillip Fracassi are brothers.
 Marvin Boughton, former Chief Financial Officer, was banned from serving as a director or officer of a company for 10 years, and fined $100,000.
 John Woodcroft was banned from serving as a director or officer of a company for 10 years, and fined $100,000.
 Graham Hoey was banned from serving as a director or officer of a company for 5 years, and fined $100,000.

References

Financial services companies established in 1900
Fraud in Canada
Corporate scandals
Companies that filed for Chapter 11 bankruptcy in 1999
Insolvent companies